Philip Burrill Low (May 6, 1836 – August 23, 1912) was a U.S. Representative from New York.

Born in Chelsea, Massachusetts, Low attended the public schools and was graduated from high school.
During the Civil War volunteered and was appointed acting ensign in the United States Navy and served in the North Atlantic Squadron during 1862 and 1863.
He resigned and engaged in commercial pursuits in Boston, Massachusetts, until 1865, when he moved to New York City.
Identified with the shipping and maritime interests.

Low was elected as a Republican to the Fifty-fourth and Fifty-fifth Congresses (March 4, 1895 – March 3, 1899).
He was an unsuccessful candidate for reelection in 1898 to the Fifty-sixth Congress.
He continued his activities in maritime pursuits in New York City until his death there on August 23, 1912.
He was interred in Woodlawn Cemetery.

Sources

1836 births
1912 deaths
Politicians from Chelsea, Massachusetts
United States Navy officers
Republican Party members of the United States House of Representatives from New York (state)
19th-century American politicians
Military personnel from Massachusetts